The 2019 SWAC women's soccer tournament was the postseason women's soccer tournament for the Southwestern Athletic Conference held November 7–10, 2019. The seven-match tournament took place at the Prairie View A&M Soccer Stadium in Prairie View, Texas. The eight-team single-elimination tournament consisted of three rounds based on seeding from regular season conference play. The defending champions were the Howard Bison, however they were unable to defend their title, losing 1–0 to the Prairie View A&M Panthers in the final. The conference tournament title was the first in the history of the Paririe View A&M women's soccer program, and the first for head coach Sonia Curvelo.

Bracket

Source:

Schedule

Quarterfinals

Semifinals

Final

Statistics

Goalscorers 
1 Goal
 Kalia Brown (Prairie View A&M)
 Ashley Chala (Prairie View A&M)
 Florence David (Grambling State)
 Lesa Griffin (Prairie View A&M)
 Alexis Henriquez (Jackson State)
 Kendall Macauly (Howard)
 Alexis Mack (Prairie View A&M)
 Arianna Morgan (Howard)
 Cassie Sandoval (Texas Southern)
 Victoria Thornton (Howard)
 Miranda Urbizu (Grambling State)

All-Tournament team

Source:

MVP in bold

References 

Southwestern Athletic Conference Women's Soccer Tournament
2019 Southwestern Athletic Conference women's soccer season